In Mandaeism, manda is the concept of gnosis or spiritual knowledge. Mandaeans stress salvation of the soul through secret knowledge (gnosis) of its divine origin. Mandaeism "provides knowledge of whence we have come and whither we are going."

Etymology
On the basis of cognates in other Aramaic dialects, Semiticists such as Mark Lidzbarski and Rudolf Macúch have translated the term manda as "knowledge" (cf.  mandaʻ in Dan. 2:21, 4:31, 33, 5:12; cf.  maddaʻ, with characteristic assimilation of /n/ to the following consonant, medial -nd- hence becoming -dd-).

Derived terms
Mandaeism ('having knowledge') comes from the Mandaic word manda, meaning "knowledge". Mandaean priests formally refer to themselves as Naṣuraia (Nasoraeans), meaning guardians or possessors of secret rites and knowledge.

Mandaia (plural: Mandaiia) is a Mandaic term that refers to a Mandaean layperson, as opposed to a Naṣuraia (Mandaean priest).

The beth manda (beit manda, bit manda, 'house of knowledge'), also called a mandi, is a Mandaean building that serves as a community center and place of worship.

The name of the uthra Manda d-Hayyi literally means the manda (gnosis) of Hayyi Rabbi ("The Life"). Manda d-Hayyi is considered to be the most important uthra, since he is the one bringing manda (knowledge or gnosis) to Earth (Tibil).

Knowledge in other religions

Christianity 
In many expressions of Christianity, such as Catholicism and Anglicanism, knowledge is one of the seven gifts of the Holy Spirit.

"The knowledge that comes from the Holy Spirit, however, is not limited to human knowledge; it is a special gift, which leads us to grasp, through creation, the greatness and love of God and his profound relationship with every creature." (Pope Francis, papal audience May 21, 2014)

Quakers
Quakers, known formally as the Religious Society of Friends, are generally united by a belief in each human's ability to experience the light within or see "that of God in every one". Most Quakers believe in continuing revelation: that God continuously reveals truth (knowledge) directly to individuals. George Fox said, "Christ has come to teach His people Himself." Friends often focus on feeling the presence of God. As Isaac Penington wrote in 1670, "It is not enough to hear of Christ, or read of Christ, but this is the thing – to feel him to be my root, my life, and my foundation..." Some express their concept of God using phrases such as "the inner light", "inward light of Christ", or "Holy Spirit". Quakers first gathered around George Fox in the mid–17th century and belong to a historically Protestant Christian set of denominations.

Hinduism 
विद्या दान (Vidya Daan) i.e. knowledge sharing is a major part of Daan, a tenet of all Dharmic Religions.
Hindu Scriptures present two kinds of knowledge, Paroksh Gyan and Prataksh Gyan. Paroksh Gyan (also spelled Paroksha-Jnana) is secondhand knowledge: knowledge obtained from books, hearsay, etc. Pratyaksh Gyan (also spelled Pratyaksha-Jnana) is the knowledge borne of direct experience, i.e., knowledge that one discovers for oneself. Jnana yoga ("path of knowledge") is one of three main types of yoga expounded by Krishna in the Bhagavad Gita. (It is compared and contrasted with Bhakti Yoga and Karma yoga.)

Islam 
In Islam, knowledge (Arabic: علم, ʿilm) is given great significance. "The Knowing" (al-ʿAlīm) is one of the 99 names reflecting distinct attributes of God. The Qur'an asserts that knowledge comes from God and various hadith encourage the acquisition of knowledge. Muhammad is reported to have said "Seek knowledge from the cradle to the grave" and "Verily the men of knowledge are the inheritors of the prophets". Islamic scholars, theologians and jurists are often given the title alim, meaning "knowledgeble".

Judaism 
In Jewish tradition, knowledge (Hebrew: דעת da'ath) is considered one of the most valuable traits a person can acquire. Observant Jews recite three times a day in the Amidah "Favor us with knowledge, understanding and discretion that come from you. Exalted are you, Existent-One, the gracious giver of knowledge." The Tanakh states, "A wise man gains power, and a man of knowledge maintains power", and "knowledge is chosen above gold".

The Old Testament's tree of the knowledge of good and evil contained the knowledge that separated Man from God: "And the LORD God said, Behold, the man is become as one of us, to know good and evil..."

See also
Gnosis
Divine spark
Enlightenment in Buddhism
Prajñā (Buddhism)
Prajna (Hinduism)
Satori in Zen Buddhism
Neoplatonism and Gnosticism

References

Mandaean philosophical concepts
Gnosticism
Spirituality
Knowledge
Mandaic words and phrases